Rezuan Khan Ahman (born 1 September 1979) is a Malaysian footballer who plays as a midfielder for Sabah FA in the Malaysia Premier League. He was the top scorer for Sabah FA in the 2000 season with 6 goals. He previously played in the state league with Beverly FC and Liga Pemuda UMNO 2006 where he finished as the top scorer.

References

External links
 Sabah Squad 2009 Season

1979 births
Malaysian footballers
People from Sabah
Living people
Sabah F.C. (Malaysia) players
People from Kota Kinabalu

Association football midfielders